Park Hee-jung may refer to:
 Park Hee-jung (golfer)
 Park Hee-jung (actress)